Alu Kurumba, also known as Hal Kurumba or alternatively Pal Kurumba, is a Southern Dravidian language of the Tamil–Kannada subgroup spoken by the Alu Kurumba tribal people. It is often considered to constitute a dialect of Kannada; however, Ethnologue classifies it as a separate language. Alu Kurumba speakers are situated on the Nilgiri Hills cross-border area between Tamil Nadu and Karnataka.

See also
Betta Kurumba language
Jennu Kurumba language
Dravidian languages
List of languages by number of native speakers in India
Languages of South Asia

References

Tamil languages
Languages of Kerala
Dravidian languages